A cant hook or pike or a hooked pike is a traditional logging tool consisting of a wooden lever handle with a movable metal hook called a dog at one end, used for handling and turning logs and cants, especially in sawmills. A peavey or peavey hook is similar, but has a spike in the working end of the handle, whereas a cant dog has a blunt end or possibly small teeth for friction.

The spike is rammed into a log, then a hook (at the end of an arm attached to a pivot a short distance up the handle) grabs the log at a second place. Once engaged, the handle gives the operator leverage to roll or slide or float the log to a new place. The peavey was named for blacksmith Joseph Peavey of Upper Stillwater, Maine, who invented the tool as a refinement to the cant hook in the 1850s (one statement says, in spring 1857). Many lumberjacks use the terms interchangeably. The Peavey Manufacturing Co. is still in Eddington, Maine and manufactures several variations. From early times to about 1910 the peavey is written about with various spellings such as "pevy" and "pivie".

Description
A logging tool description from the Lumberman's Museum at Patten, Maine, reads in part: "A cant dog or cant hook was used for lifting, turning, and prying logs when loading sleds and on the drive. At first, a swivel hook on a pole with nothing to hold it in position was used. This was called a swing dingle." However, the term swing dingle is more often published as being a type of logging sled. These early types are also called a ring dog or ring dog cant hook. In 1858, Joseph Peavey, a blacksmith in Stillwater, Maine, made a rigid clasp to encircle the cant dog handle with the hook on one side. It moved up and down, but not sideways. All loggers have used it ever since." 

While this tool has its origins in the logging industry, many arborists, tree care professionals, land owners and portable sawmill operators now use cant hooks for moving logs and timber.

Gallery

See also 
 Boat hook
 Drawknife
 Forestry hook
 Pickaroon
 Pike pole
 Sappel 
 Tongs

References

External links

 Cant Hook or Peavey?—A great article on the history of the cant hook and peavey. 
 Logging Lingo—Here's a quick brush-up on the lingo used by loggers, with fair warning that terminology differs from one region to another.
 Peavey Manufacturing Co.

Forestry tools
Log transport
Logging
Mechanical hand tools